Neozana is a genus of moths in the subfamily Arctiinae. It contains the single species Neozana germana, which is found in Peru.

References

Natural History Museum Lepidoptera generic names catalog

Lithosiini